The following elections occurred in the year 1882.

Europe
 1882 Norwegian parliamentary election

North America
 1882 Newfoundland general election

Canada
 1882 British Columbia general election
 1882 Canadian federal election
 1882 New Brunswick general election
 1882 Newfoundland general election
 1882 Nova Scotia general election
 1882 Prince Edward Island general election

United States
 United States House of Representatives elections in California, 1882
 1882 New York state election
 United States House of Representatives elections in South Carolina, 1882
 1882 South Carolina gubernatorial election
 1882 United States House of Representatives elections
 1882 and 1883 United States Senate elections

See also
 :Category:1882 elections

1882
1882 elections
Elections